Ride the Lightning is the fourth album by Elephant Six band Marshmallow Coast. It is written by Andy Gonzales and features members of Of Montreal as the backing band.

Track listing

Personnel 
 Derek Almstead – bass, bongos, engineer, keyboards, mastering, mixing, percussion, producer, vibraphone, vocal harmony, vocals
 Dottie – piano, vocals
 Andy Gonzales – banjo, composer, design, guitar, keyboards, layout design, melodica, piano, electric piano, producer, vocals
 Eric Harris – drums, theremin
 Jamie Huggins – drums, percussion
 Kelly Ruberto – design, layout design

References

2001 albums
Marshmallow Coast albums